For information on all University of California, Berkeley sports, see California Golden Bears

The California Golden Bears men's soccer team is a varsity intercollegiate athletic team of University of California, Berkeley in Berkeley, California, United States. The team is a member of the Pac-12 Conference, which is part of the National Collegiate Athletic Association's Division I. California's first men's soccer team was fielded in 1906. The team plays its home games at Edwards Stadium. The Golden Bears are coached by Kevin Grimes.

History
The Bears have been in several NCAA conferences over their 110-year history. In 1983, the Bears won the Pacific Soccer Conference. The Bears won the Mountain Pacific Men's Soccer Tournament in 1996. In 2000, the Bears joined the Pac-12 Conference, when men's soccer was enlisted as a varsity sport in the conference. Since then, the Bears have won three Pac-12 titles: 2006, 2007 and 2010.

The Bears have appeared in the NCAA Division I Men's Soccer Championship 18 times. Their best performances came in 1960, 2005 and 2013, where the Bears reached the quarter-finals of the competition.

Roster

Head coaching record

NCAA tournament results 
The Bears have made 19 NCAA Tournament appearances

Honors 
California Intercollegiate Soccer Conference (5): 1936, 1937, 1938, 1946, 1947
Mountain Pacific Sports Federation (1): 1996
Pac-12 Conference (3): 2006, 2007, 2010
Pacific Soccer Conference (1): 1983

Notable players

Steve Birnbaum, 2011 and 2013 All-Pac-12 first team, 2011 Jewish Sports Review first-team All-American, National Soccer Coaches Association of America (NSCAA) 2013 First Team All-American, and NSCAA 2013 First Team All-Far-West Team.
Calen Carr
Stefan Frei
Sam Junqua
Leo Krupnik (born 1979), Ukrainian-born American-Israeli former soccer player and current soccer coach
Nick Lima

References

External links 

 

 
1906 establishments in California
Association football clubs established in 1906